Diaulota fulviventris is a species of rove beetle in the family Staphylinidae. It is found in Central America, North America, and Mexico.

References

Further reading

 
 

Aleocharinae
Beetles described in 1956